Robert Stanley Dow (born March 8, 1945) is an American fencer. He competed in the team sabre event at the 1972 Summer Olympics.

He received his Bachelor of Science in Civil and Environmental Engineering from the Newark College of Engineering (now New Jersey Institute of Technology (NJIT)), a Masters of Science in Civil and Environment Engineering from NYU and an MBA from Columbia University. He is the retired senior managing partner of Lord Abbett.

Raised in Westwood and Washington Township, Bergen County, New Jersey, Dow is the son of Olympic fencers Warren Dow and Helen Mrocckowska, who both competed at the 1948 Summer Olympics in London.

References

External links
 

1945 births
Living people
American male sabre fencers
Columbia Business School alumni
Olympic fencers of the United States
Fencers at the 1972 Summer Olympics
Sportspeople from Bergen County, New Jersey
Polytechnic Institute of New York University alumni
New Jersey Institute of Technology alumni
People from Washington Township, Bergen County, New Jersey
People from Westwood, New Jersey